Avalanchurus is an extinct genus of trilobites from the Silurian period. It was originally described in 1993 as a subgenus of Struszia, and then promoted in 1997 to genus status.

Species
The genus contains five described species, most of them named after famous musicians:

 Avalanchurus dakon (Šnajdr, 1983)
 Avalanchurus lennoni Edgecombe & Chatterton, 1993 (named in honour of John Lennon)
 Avalanchurus starri Edgecombe & Chatterton, 1993 (named in honour of Ringo Starr)
 Avalanchurus simoni Adrain & Edgecombe, 1997 (named in honour of Paul Simon)
 Avalanchurus garfunkeli Adrain & Edgecombe, 1997 (named in honour of Art Garfunkel)

See also
 List of organisms named after famous people (born 1900–1949)

References

External links 
 Avalanchurus at the Paleobiology Database

Fossils of British Columbia
Encrinuridae genera
Paleozoic life of the Northwest Territories
Paleozoic life of Nunavut